Kyle Cameron Walter Spence (born 14 January 1997) is a professional footballer who plays as a midfielder for FSV Frankfurt. Born in England, he has represented Scotland at youth international level.

Born in Croydon, Spence began his career with local club Crystal Palace before joining Coventry City who he made his professional debut for later that year. He has since played in Norway, Lithuania and Germany.

Club career

Career in England 
Born in Croydon, Surrey, Spence attended Oasis Academy Shirley Park and trained at Fulham Academy but chose to sign with the Crystal Palace Academy. He played for Croydon Schools FA and Surrey Schools FA U14 county team, they won the English Schools U14 National County Cup final on 10 May 2011 by beating Oxford 4–3 on penalties at Brentford's Griffin Park and featured notable players, such as, Jeremie Boga, Patrick Roberts and Ryan Sweeney. The following year, Spence went on to win the national title on 24 April 2012 with his school, as they beat Ribblesdale High School 3–0 at Derby County's Pride Park Stadium. On 7 May 2013, he won the Crystal Palace Oasis Academy player of the year. Spence was part of the Crystal Palace Academy squad coached by John Salako and Mark Bright.

Spence joined Coventry City in 2014. He made his professional debut as a substitute on 2 September 2014 in a 1–0 Football League Trophy win over Wycombe Wanderers, coming on to replace Mohamed Coulibaly after 80 minutes. Following his progression with the U18's squad, Spence was offered a professional contract with the club but he did not sign the deal and left Coventry City in the summer of 2015.

After spending time on trial at Millwall, Spence re-signed with Coventry City for the second time in February 2016, until the end of the season. After making his return, Spence played in the club's reserve side for the season and signed a one-year contract extension with Coventry City. Following this, he made his first team appearance of the 2016–17 season, coming on as a 67th-minute substitute, in a 0–0 draw against Shrewsbury Town on 13 August 2016. His second appearance of the season came on 23 August 2016 came against Norwich City in the second round of the League Cup, as the club lost 6–1. Having made two appearances in all competitions, Spence was released at the end of the 2016–17 season.

Spence joined Hampton & Richmond Borough on 4 August 2017. He made his debut for the club, coming on as a 55th-minute substitute, in a 1–1 draw against East Thurrock United on 5 August 2017. Spence went on to make four appearances for Hampton & Richmond Borough before leaving the club to join Kingstonian on 29 August 2017 and then joined East Grinstead Town the following month.

Norway
On 11 February 2018, Spence moved to Norway, where he signed for Norwegian fourth-tier side Valdres.

On 14 April 2018, Spence scored a hat trick on his league debut against Vestfossen, resulting a 4–1 win for the club. This was followed up by scoring his fourth goal for Valdres, in a 2–1 win against Brumunddal in the first round of the Norwegian Cup and scored three days later against Skjetten Fotball. Since joining the club, he quickly established himself in the first team. Spence later scored five more goals later in the 2018 season, including a brace against Østsiden. He finished the 2018 season with 27 appearances, 10 goals and 8 assists in all competitions. Following this, Spence did not sign a contract with Valdres, resulting in him leaving the club.

It was reported on 8 February 2019 that Spence went on trial with Norwegian third-tier side Alta. His trial proved to be successful and he signed for the club on 14 March 2019.

Spence made his debut for Alta in the opening game of the season against Mjølner, coming on as a 79th-minute substitute, in a 3–0 win. On 22 May, he scored his first goal for the club in a 3–0 win over Fløya in the Norwegian Football Cup before scoring his first league goal just over two weeks later in a 2–2 draw with Asker. Since joining Alta, Spence quickly established himself in the starting eleven for the club. It wasn't until on 1 September 2019 when he scored twice for Alta, in a 3–2 win against Sotra. Three weeks later on 22 September 2019, Spence scored his fifth goal for the club, in a 2–1 win against Kjelsas IL. Until the end of the 2019 season, he went on to make 29 appearances scoring five times in all competitions. Following this, Alta offered Spence a new contract to stay at the club.

On 8 January 2020, Spence joined newly formed Norwegian First Division side Øygarden instead. However, due to the pandemic, the season was pushed back to July. On 20 July 2020, he made his Norwegian First Division debut for his new side as a substitute in a 4–4 draw with Raufoss. He went on to make sixteen appearances in all competitions in his first season with the club.

Lithuania
On 16 April 2021, Spence left Norway to head to Lithuania, joining A Lyga side Hegelmann Litauen until the end of the season. He was nominated for A Lyga player of the month for July 2021.

In June 2022, Spence joined German Regionalliga Südwest side FSV Frankfurt on a free transfer.

International career
Spence was called up by Scotland under-16 in 2012, having been eligible to play for Scotland through his grandparents and made his debut on 21 August 2012 against Latvia U16. He went on to make seven appearances for the under-16s, scoring one goal against Turkey in 2012.

Personal life
Spence's great aunt is Madge Saunders, a Jamaican Christian minister and community worker who was the first woman in the United Church in Jamaica and the Cayman Islands to serve as a parish minister.

Career statistics

References

External links
 
 
 

1997 births
Living people
Association football midfielders
English footballers
Scottish footballers
English people of Scottish descent
Coventry City F.C. players
Hampton & Richmond Borough F.C. players
Kingstonian F.C. players
East Grinstead Town F.C. players
English Football League players
National League (English football) players
Isthmian League players
Scotland youth international footballers
Footballers from Croydon
Scottish expatriate footballers
Expatriate footballers in Norway
Scottish expatriate sportspeople in Norway
Alta IF players
Norwegian Third Division players
English expatriate footballers
English expatriate sportspeople in Norway
Øygarden FK players
Expatriate footballers in Lithuania
English expatriate sportspeople in Lithuania
Norwegian Second Division players
Norwegian First Division players
A Lyga players
Expatriate footballers in Germany
English expatriate sportspeople in Germany
FSV Frankfurt players